Whakatīwai is a locality on the Seabird Coast on the western shore of the Firth of Thames, in the Hauraki District, New Zealand. Whakatīwai is the location of Wharekawa Marae, which holds importance for Ngāti Paoa and Ngāti Whanaunga. Whakatīwai Regional Park is just north of Whakatīwai. Until 2010, Whakatīwai was a part of the Franklin District. Because it was previously considered a part of the Auckland region, the Whakatīwai Regional Park continues to be owned and operated by the Auckland Council.

History

Whakatīwai is the site where the Tainui ancestor Hotunui settled, after exiling himself from the Kāwhia Harbour. Hotunui's son Marutūahu established a pā at Whakatīwai, and Marutūahu's sons became the ancestors of the five tribes of the Marutūāhu collective. Whakatīwai became a settlement of Ngāti Pāoa, one of the Marutūāhu tribes, and is called the poutokomanawa ("heart post") of the Ngāti Paoa rohe. During the Musket Wars in 1821, the Ngāti Pāoa settlement at Whakatīwai was sacked. Ngāti Pāoa continued to live in the area, and in 1827 Ngāti Pāoa sheltered Apihai Te Kawau, paramount chief of Ngāti Whātua, at Whakatīwai during the war. In 1874, Ngāti Pāoa held a great hui at Whakatīwai for over 3,000 delegates to finalise the plans for opening the Ohinemuri goldfields in the Karangahake Gorge, which included speakers Wiremu Kīngi and Tareha Te Moananui and crown negotiator James Mackay.

In the early 20th century, Whakatīwai was predominantly Māori, while Kaiaua directly to the south was predominantly Pākehā. Because of this, the Kaiaua School was moved to a location central for both townships in the 1930s.

, a minesweeper from World War II, was beached at Stevenson's gravel quarry in the mid-1950s to serve as a breakwater. A photograph of the wreck featured on the cover of The Islander, a record album by Dave Dobbyn.

References

Hauraki District
Ngāti Pāoa
Populated places around the Firth of Thames